Romare Bearden Park is a 5.4-acre public park located at 300 S. Church Street in Charlotte, North Carolina. Named for Charlotte born artist Romare Bearden, it opened in late August 2013.  It is across the street from Truist Field, the home of the International League's Charlotte Knights.

Located in Uptown Charlotte, the park offers fitness and cultural arts programs throughout the year.  The park design is based on Bearden’s collages and paintings as interpreted by supervising artist Norie Sato.  It features two gardens, a courtyard of dining tables with chairs on a bed of crushed granite, a formal event green field, a play area with interactive digital chimes including dance chimes, and several waterfalls.

The grand opening took place on August 31-September 1, 2013.

References

External links
 Plan for Romare Bearden Park, Video

2013 establishments in North Carolina
Parks in Charlotte, North Carolina
Protected areas established in 2013